The Skallagrímur women's basketball team, commonly known as Skallagrímur, is the women's basketball department of  Ungmennafélagið Skallagrímur, based in Borgarnes, Iceland. It currently plays in Úrvalsdeild kvenna.

History
Skallagrímur started its women's program in 1958. In 1963, it participated in the national tournament and finished as the runner-up to ÍR. In 1964 it won its first national championship after finishing first in the national tournament. In the  championship clinching game, Skallagrímur defeating ÍR 23-22 behind Sigrún Kristjánsdóttir 17 points.

In 2016-2017 it finished with the third best record in league, while also making it to the Icelandic Basketball Cup finals where it lost to Keflavík, 65-62.

On 15 February 2020, it won the Icelandic Basketball Cup for the first time, defeating KR in the cup finals with Keira Robinson being named the Cup Finals MVP.

On 20 September 2020, Skallagrímur won the Icelandic Super Cup for the first time after defeating Valur 74-68.

On 9 December 2021, the board of Skallagrímur announced that they were withdrawing the team from the Úrvalsdeild. At the time, the team was in last place in the Úrvalsdeild, having lost all 11 games.

Honours
Úrvalsdeild kvenna
 Winners (1): 1964

Icelandic Cup
 Winners (1): 2020
 Runner-up (1): 2017

Icelandic Super Cup
 Winners (1): 2020
 Runner-up (1): 2017

Division I
 Winners (3): 1996, 1997, 2016

Individual awards
Úrvalsdeild Women's Domestic All-First Team
Sigrún Sjöfn Ámundadóttir - 2017
Icelandic Cup Finals MVP
Keira Robinson - 2020

Notable players

 Auður Íris Ólafsdóttir
 Carmen Tyson-Thomas
 Embla Kristínardóttir
 Emilie Hesseldal
 Fanney Lind Thomas
 Guðrún Ósk Ámundadóttir
 Hulda K. Harðardóttir
 Ingibjörg Hargrave
 Jóhanna Björk Sveinsdóttir
 Lidia Mirchandani
 Keira Robinson
 Kristrún Sigurjónsdóttir
 María Erla Geirsdóttir
 Ragnheiður Benónísdóttir
 Sanja Orozović
 Sigrún Sjöfn Ámundadóttir
 Tavelyn Brittany James (Tillman)
 Þóra Kristín Jónsdóttir
 Ziomara Morrison

Coaches

References

External links
Official website
KKÍ.is profile

Skallagrímur (basketball)